Leonarda Angela Casiraghi, popularly known as Doddamma, was an Italian-born naturalised Indian Catholic missionary and social worker, known for her medical service in Dharwad, in the south Indian state of Karnataka. She founded a small medical dispensary in Dharwad in 1958, which later grew to become a full-fledged hospital by name, Our Lady of Lourdes Charitable Hospital. She came to India in 1955 and worked in Mangalore and Hyderabad for three years before founding the medical facility in Dharwad. A member of the Sisters of Charity of Saints Bartolomea Capitanio and Vincenza Gerosa congregation, she was the administrator of the hospital and its sister concern, Our Lady of Lourdes School of Nursing, since their inception. She was awarded the fourth highest civilian award of the Padma Shri by the Government of India, in 1998, for her services to the society

Casiraghi died on 27 August 2011, at Dharwad.

See also 

 Sisters of Charity of Saints Bartolomea Capitanio and Vincenza Gerosa (SCCG)

References 

Recipients of the Padma Shri in social work
Year of birth missing
2011 deaths
Italian emigrants to India
Indian Roman Catholic missionaries
Social workers
People from Dharwad
Roman Catholic missionaries in India
Female Roman Catholic missionaries
Roman Catholic medical missionaries
Christian clergy from Karnataka
Women educators from Karnataka
Educators from Karnataka
Social workers from Karnataka